Carlson Elizabeth Young (born October 29, 1990) is an American actress. She is known for her roles on Disney Channel's As the Bell Rings, the film Premature, Comedy Central's Key & Peele, and as Brooke Maddox in the first two seasons of the MTV television series Scream.

Career 

Young made her directorial debut in 2018 with "The Blazing World", a short film inspired by Young's own dreams and the titular work by Margaret Cavendish. In 2020 it was announced that the concept would be turned into a feature-length film, directed by and starring Young, and soundtracked by Isom Innis. Young is set to continue the Saturn Returns trilogy with two subsequent films.

In September 2020, Young directed the music video for "Catch & Release" by Peel (the project of Innis and Sean Cimino).

Her next upcoming project is a middle school-set fantasy horror film Femina Nox, to which she has written the manuscript and which she may also direct.

Personal life 
Young is originally from Fort Worth, Texas. She moved to Los Angeles and attended the University of Southern California, where she studied creative writing and enjoyed writing poetry.

In January 2016, Young became engaged to Foster the People member and producer Isom Innis. Innis had proposed after he and Young were rescued from a mountain in Iceland. They were married on April 29, 2017 in Fort Worth, Texas at Saint Andrew's Episcopal Church which Young attended as a child.

Filmography

References

External links
 
 

1990 births
Living people
21st-century American actresses
Actresses from Texas
American film actresses
American television actresses